Petra Tichá-Adámková (born 21 June 1991) is a Czech handballer for DHC Sokol Poruba and the Czech national team.

She participated at the 2018 European Women's Handball Championship.

Achievements
Czech First Division:
Winner: 2012

References

1991 births
Living people
Sportspeople from Ostrava
Czech female handball players
Expatriate handball players
Czech expatriate sportspeople in Germany
Frisch Auf Göppingen players
21st-century Czech women